Kibi dango may refer to:
 , a bygone Japanese food, famous for being the ration of the folktale hero Momotarō
, a specialty sweet of Okayama Prefecture
, sweet-rice treats from Hokkaido
, produced in Monou, Miyagi